Adrian C. Madaro (born November 2, 1988) is a State Representative who represents the 1st Suffolk District in the Massachusetts House of Representatives. He represents the East Boston section of the City of Boston.

He was born in Boston and graduated from Boston Latin School. Upon graduation from college, he served as a legislative aide to Carlo Basile. He obtained his Master of Arts degree in urban and environmental policy and planning with serving as an aide, and his law degree while serving as Representative in 2019.

Madaro's Committee assignments have varied. In the 191st Session, Madaro served as the Vice Chair on the Joint Committee on Transportation, and on the House Committee on Post Audit and Oversight, and the Joint Committee on Consumer Protection and Professional Licensure.

See also
 2019–2020 Massachusetts legislature
 2021–2022 Massachusetts legislature

References

External links
 Representative Adrian Madaro (official House site)

Living people
21st-century American politicians
Democratic Party members of the Massachusetts House of Representatives
Tufts University alumni
Suffolk University alumni
1988 births